La Presse can refer to the following newspapers or news agencies:

La Presse (Canadian newspaper), published in Montreal, Canada
La Presse (French newspaper), published in the 19th and early 20th century
La Presse de Tunisie, a Tunisian newspaper
La Presse Porto-Novienne, newspaper published in Porto-Novo, Benin